Panathinaikos B.C. in international competitions is the history and statistics of Panathinaikos B.C. in FIBA Europe and Euroleague Basketball Company competitions.

European competitions

Worldwide competitions

See also
 Greek basketball clubs in international competitions

External links 

 
Panathinaikos B.C. at Euroleague.net
Panathinaikos B.C. at Eurobasket.com
Panathinaikos Arena

Greek basketball clubs in European and worldwide competitions
Panathinaikos B.C.